Thomas J. Connolly (born September 25, 1957) is an American attorney and Maine Democratic Party activist. Connolly, a Scarborough resident and attorney based in Portland's Old Port, ran for Governor of Maine in 1998 against incumbent unenrolled Angus King, receiving 13%. During the 2000 presidential election, Connolly leaked news of George W. Bush's 1976 arrest in Kennebunkport, Maine for drunken driving. In October 2006, Connolly was arrested and charged with a misdemeanor for "standing on the side of the highway dressed in a rubber Osama Bin Laden mask, waving a plastic gun and a sign protesting a Taxpayer Bill of Rights."

He graduated with a Bachelor of Arts in History from Bates College in 1979 and a Juris Doctor from the University of Maine School of Law in 1982. He and his wife Elaine have three children. He practices law in Portland, Maine.

References

1957 births
Living people
Maine Democrats
Maine lawyers
People from Scarborough, Maine
People from Canton, Massachusetts
21st-century American lawyers
20th-century American lawyers
Bates College alumni
University of Maine School of Law alumni